Area code 313 is a telephone area code of the North American Numbering Plan serving Detroit and most of its closest suburbs in Wayne County, Michigan. It includes the enclave cities Hamtramck and Highland Park, as well as Allen Park, Dearborn, Dearborn Heights, Ecorse, Inkster, Melvindale, the Grosse Pointe communities, Lincoln Park, Redford, River Rouge, and Taylor north of Goddard Road and east of Holland Road.

History
Area code 313 was assigned as one of the original 86 area codes in 1947. It originally served the entire southeastern quadrant of Michigan, including Metro Detroit, Flint, and the southern part of Michigan's "Thumb".

Because of the demand for new telephone service in Detroit's suburbs and neighboring areas, the northern portion, including Detroit's northern suburbs, Flint and the southern Thumb were split off with new area code 810 on December 1, 1993. On December 13, 1997, the remaining 313 area was reduced to its current size when the western portion, including Ann Arbor, Monroe County and western and downriver Wayne County, received area code 734 in another split.

Area code 679 has been reserved as a future overlay for the 313 territory. Relief planning is in progress, but 2021 estimates do not expect 313 to be exhausted until 2025.

In popular culture
Rappers from Detroit often mention 313 in their music in reference to this area and its notoriety. One of the tracks in the 1996 Eminem independent debut solo album Infinite is titled "313". In the 2002 film 8 Mile, featuring the artist, the 313 area code is mentioned multiple times, because of the film's setting in Detroit. Eminem's character, B–Rabbit, and his friends call their group "three one third", their nickname for the area code.

See also
 List of North American Numbering Plan area codes

References

External links
 Map of Michigan area codes at North American Numbering Plan Administration's website

313
313
Culture of Detroit
Telecommunications-related introductions in 1947